Gagata pakistanica is a species of sisorid catfish which is probably endemic to Pakistan.

References
 

Sisoridae
Freshwater fish of Pakistan
Endemic fauna of Pakistan
Fish described in 1999